Hewago Paul Oea (born 13 December 2001) is a professional Australian rules footballer playing for the Gold Coast Suns in the Australian Football League (AFL).

Oea is the first locally-developed Papua New Guinean and the first overseas developed player to play senior AFL.

Early life
Oea was born in Gordon, Papua New Guinea the youngest of seven children to parents from the Gulf and Central provinces, mother Lala Mai and father Paul Oea. Hewago's middle name is in honour of his father, and forms part of the name he is registered under as a player in Australia.

His introduction to Australian rules was through Niukick in Port Moresby at the age of 12. An outstanding junior talent known for his fast pace, Oea played both junior and senior football with the Gordon Kokofas in the Port Moresby league. He was identified by the PNG Talent Academy's William Yogomine as a development prospect and was selected in the Papua New Guinea's Under 14 side for the Queensland State Championships. AFL South Pacific Development Manager, Ben Drew invited him to represent the South Pacific Under 16 against North Queensland in 2016, during which he was named the team's best, a feat he would repeat in 2017.

International Cup and Gold Coast international scholarship
At just 15 years of age, Oea was called up to play in the senior Papua New Guinea team for the 2017 Australian Football International Cup. In the grand final he kicked a crucial goal on the half-time siren helping the side to win its 3rd cup, and was named best on ground for his effort. He also achieved All-International honours during the tournament.

Following the cup, Oea moved to Queensland to improve his chances of being drafted to the AFL, playing a handful of games at Colts level with the Broadbeach Australian Football Club on the Gold Coast where his brother Hapeo Bobogi (to the same parents) had been playing. Bobogi himself was also a Queensland Under 16 representative in 2016 and played alongside Hewago in the 2017 International Cup side however switched to rugby league in 2021.

On the Gold Coast Hewago was billeted in Australia by AFLQ Gold Coast development co-ordinator Tim Searl and his wife Chris, Oea at the time spoke very little English as it was his third language. Against the Labrador Tigers, Oea kicked 5 goals and was named among the best afield. Shortly afterward he was selected in the Queensland Under 16 team for 2017, he continued the outstanding form kicking 5 goals against Tasmania and 4 goals against the Northern Territory. Oea was selected for the AFL Academy, graduating in 2019.

Oea was signed to the Gold Coast Football Club Suns Academy in 2018 on an international scholarship giving the club first choice of him in the 2019 rookie draft, however he was overlooked in favour of gaelic footballer Luke Towey and decathlete Patrick Murtagh. Oea however achieved selection in the Allies Under 18 side that year. He competed in the 2018 QAFL grand final for Broadbeach against Palm Beach Currumbin and kicked three goals for his team that day.

The Suns selected him as a Category B rookie in the 2020 AFL Draft. He was offered a one-year contract extension, along with Murtagh, in 2021. He spent a season developing in the Sun's NEAFL side including a Rising Star nomination in Round 6. For his NEAFL performances, he was elevated to the club's Category B rookie list. He spent the first half of 2022 playing in the Sun's VFL side as a small forward. Following consistent form in the VFL and a 3-goal game against Collingwood, Oea was called up to the senior side, initially as an emergency, then elevated to the interchange replacing Chris Burgess in the side due to the prevailing wet conditions.

AFL career
Oea scored a goal with his first kick and with limited on-field time went on to garner six possessions and assist in Gold Coast goals in a successful debut, though the Suns lost narrowly.
 
Oea kicked another goal in his second game, however suffered a dislocated finger during after the siren celebrations after teammate Noah Anderson's after the siren winning goal.

References

2001 births
Living people
Gold Coast Football Club players
People from the National Capital District (Papua New Guinea)
Papua New Guinean players of Australian rules football
VFL/AFL players born outside Australia
AFL Academy graduates